Moovn Technologies, LLC, commonly known as Moovn, is an American ridesharing company based in Seattle.

The company owns a mobile platform that allows users to schedule rides weeks in advance and guarantees no dynamic pricing. Moovn does not own any vehicles but instead receives a  commission from each booking and drivers retain the remaining fare. In Kenya and Tanzania, the vehicles include cars, motorcycles and auto rickshaws.

History 

Moovn was founded in the year 2015 by Godwin Gabriel, a limousine taxi businessman and immigrant from Tanzania. In 2016, it had a 12-person team at its Seattle headquarters and 37 full-time employees supporting its Sub-Saharan operations. In 2017 during an Uber boycott, Moovn experienced a surge in demand. By the year 2018, the company had raised US 1.5 million in capital and up to 3,000 rides per day were being booked through the company's app.

As of 2018, Moovn operates in seven cities in the United States, including New York City, Atlanta and San Francisco. It also has operations in select cities in Sub-Saharan Africa including Nairobi (Kenya) and Dar es Saalam (Tanzania).

External links 
 Official website

References 

Ridesharing companies of the United States